Wenche-Lin Hess (born 28 March 1975) is a Norwegian archer. She was born in Bergen. She competed at the 1996 Summer Olympics in Atlanta, where she placed 17h in the Women's individual. She also competed at the 2000 Summer Olympics in Sydney.

References

External links

1975 births
Living people
People from Horten
Norwegian female archers
Olympic archers of Norway
Archers at the 1996 Summer Olympics
Archers at the 2000 Summer Olympics
Sportspeople from Vestfold og Telemark